Adolf Schmal (born 12 January 1885, date of death unknown) was an Austrian sports shooter. He competed in two events at the 1912 Summer Olympics.

References

External links
 

1885 births
Year of death missing
Austrian male sport shooters
Olympic shooters of Austria
Shooters at the 1912 Summer Olympics
Sportspeople from Brno
20th-century Austrian people